"Helter Shelter" is the fifth episode of the fourteenth season of the American animated television series The Simpsons. It originally aired on the Fox network in the United States on December 1, 2002. In the episode, the Simpson family has to find temporary residence while their house is fumigated for termites. When they run out of options, they decide to become contestants on a reality show where families live in the manner that people did in 1895. The family is initially miserable, but slowly adapt to their new life, which causes the show to lose ratings. The producers decide to try to boost viewers by dumping the house in a river and forcing the family to survive in the wilderness. However, the Simpsons find a bunch of rejects from other reality shows and they attack the producers.

Plot
After Homer is hit by a falling girder at work and suffers a mild head injury, Mr. Burns gives him luxury skybox tickets to a hockey game in order to keep him from suing the power plant. Homer, Marge and Bart ignore the game in favor of enjoying the amenities, while Lisa leaves the box in order to watch the game from rink-side. One of the players gives her his stick in gratitude for her useful advice, and Homer mounts it on the wall above her bed that night. In so doing, though, he releases a swarm of termites that cause severe damage to the house overnight. The Simpsons are forced to move out for six months so the house can be fumigated.

Finding themselves without any suitable lodgings, they learn from Barney and Carl about The 1895 Challenge, a reality show in which a family must inhabit a Victorian era house and adopt a lifestyle consistent with the title year. Homer is reluctant at first, but takes the family to audition for the show. The producers select the Simpsons after watching Homer's overreactions to trivial things. The family has trouble adjusting to the drastic changes in daily life at first, leading to high ratings among viewers who enjoy watching their misery. However, Homer soon rallies their spirits and their attitudes improve as they begin to adapt to 1895 life. When the ratings begin to fall as a result, the producers introduce Squiggy from Laverne & Shirley into the show, even allowing him to use a Taser as a means of disrupting the peaceful situation. After this ploy fails to boost the ratings, the producers secretly airlift the house off its foundations and drop it in a river while the Simpsons are sleeping.

The crew films the house's plunge over a waterfall and its collapse after running aground. Squiggy is killed in the crash, but the Simpsons emerge unhurt from the wreckage and must forage for food and shelter in the wilderness, since the crew refuses to give them lunch. They soon encounter a group of savage-looking people who turn out to be a tribe of contestants from another reality show, left to fend for themselves after they lost their final challenge. They team up with the Simpsons to overpower the crew and return to civilization. With the family back in their newly fumigated house, Homer decides he will only watch scripted television shows, but can find nothing good to watch. He eventually falls victim to Bart's pranks with the garden hose outside, to the enjoyment of Marge and Lisa.

Production

"Helter Shelter" was written by Brian Pollack and Mert Rich and directed by Mark Kirkland as part of the fourteenth season of The Simpsons (2002–03). Actor David Lander, who portrayed Squiggy in Laverne & Shirley, guest starred in the episode as that character, while boxer Larry Holmes appeared as himself. This is the final aired episode of The Simpsons to be animated using the traditional ink-and-paint technique. Since the following episode, "The Great Louse Detective", The Simpsons has been animated with digital ink and paint. Digital animation had previously been used by the show on season 7's "Radioactive Man" and season 12's "Tennis the Menace", primarily to test the technique.

Whilst the family look for places to stay. Lisa informs them they could stay at a youth hostel. Bart then responds: “I do not want another lecture from a German backpacker about how we don't appreciate the National Park System!." In "The Heartbroke Kid", the family actually convert 742 Evergreen Terrace into an youth hostel in order to pay for Bart's weight loss camp bills.

Cultural references
The TV show that the Simpson family goes on is a parody of a PBS TV show called The 1900 House. The show had a family live in a Victorian house, and live as if it were the year 1900. The scene in which the Simpsons wait outside their house waiting for time to "fly by" is a parody of the opening sequence of King of the Hill. The poison bottle has a face of James Coburn on it.

This is the third time Bill Cosby has been parodied on The Simpsons. There is an extra gag in that the Cosby family are losing ratings on their reality show, so the producers decide on the Simpsons; in the early years, The Cosby Show was a ratings rival with The Simpsons. "Squiggy" being sent to boost The 1895 Challenge ratings is another reference to The Cosby Show, who sent "Smitty" (Adam Sandler) to the Cosby's house. Following Cosby's initial conviction of multiple sexual assault cases in 2018, the scene which parodies Cosby in the auditions for The 1895 Challenge has been cut out of television airings of this episode.

The episode title is a reference to The Beatles song "Helter Skelter".

Bart laments having access only to Mutt and Jeff comic books and is quoted as saying, "This has been the worst week of my life. I miss my toys and my video games. Mutt and Jeff comics are NOT funny! They're gay, I get it!". Although everything in the Victorian House is supposed to be from 1895 and before, Mutt and Jeff was not created until 1907.

Exterminators "A Bug's Death" is a parody (namely their logo) of the 1998 Disney/Pixar film A Bug's Life.

Release
The episode originally aired on the Fox network in the United States on December 1, 2002. It was viewed in approximately 8.75 million households that night. With a Nielsen rating of 8.2, the episode finished 22nd in the ratings for the week of November 25 – December 1, 2002. It was the highest-rated broadcast on Fox that week, beating shows such as Boston Public, King of the Hill, 24, and Malcolm in the Middle. On December 6, 2011, "Helter Shelter" was released on Blu-ray and DVD as part of the box set The Simpsons – The Complete Fourteenth Season. Staff members Al Jean, Dan Greaney, Carolyn Omine, Kevin Curran, Mark Kirkland, David Silverman, J. Stewart Burns, Allen Glazier, and Steven Dean Moore participated in the DVD audio commentary for the episode. Deleted scenes from the episode were also included in the box set.

Since airing, "Helter Shelter" has received generally negative reviews from critics. DVD Movie Guide's Colin Jacobson commented that the story of the episode is "not a terrible idea for an episode, but it's not a particularly exciting one, either. The show plods through its scenario without much life, mostly because parodies of reality TV just aren't very interesting; the programs they mock are already so absurd that there's not much room for satire." Ryan Keefer of DVD Talk wrote that the episode is "a prime example of [the show's writers] trying to do something funny and falling flat."

References

External links

 Helter Shelter (The Simpsons) script at Springfield! Springfield!

The Simpsons (season 14) episodes
Reality television series parodies
2002 American television episodes